Dendrobium luteolum is a species of epiphytic orchid in the subtribe Dendrobiinae.

It is native to Peninsular Malaysia and Myanmar in Southeast Asia.  It grows along streams at low elevations.

The fragrant flowers are white and yellow.

References

External links

luteolum
Orchids of Malaysia
Orchids of Myanmar
Flora of Peninsular Malaysia
Plants described in 1864